Abu Iqal al-Aghlab ibn Ibrahim was the fourth Aghlabid emir of Ifriqiya, ruling from 838 to his death in February 841. He was renowned for his erudition and intelligence, and his capable administration. He was succeeded by his son Muhammad I.

References

Sources
 

841 deaths
Aghlabid emirs of Ifriqiya